"The Morning Papers" is a song by American musician Prince and the New Power Generation from their 1992  album Love Symbol. It was released as the fourth worldwide (and fifth overall) single from the album in March 1993; the B-side is "Live 4 Love", a track from Prince's previous album, Diamonds and Pearls. The UK CD single included "Love 2 the 9's" as well, also from Love Symbol.

The lyrics of the song concern Prince falling in love with Mayte Garcia, and sticks to the theme of the movie 3 Chains o' Gold, where Mayte (a princess in Egypt) and Prince meet after her father is assassinated by seven mysterious men. Prince sings about the things they do together and how other people do not value/understand the bond they share. Musically, the song is a pop-rock ballad with an emphasis on guitar. The video is notable for featuring Prince embracing "the grunge look".

Chart performance
"The Morning Papers" was a moderate success on all the charts on which it appeared. It peaked at number 44 on the US Billboard Hot 100, number 18 on the Top 40 Mainstream, number 68 on R&B/Hip-Hop Songs, and number 52 in the UK. The song became the first song by Prince released in proper form in the United Kingdom to miss the top 40 since "Mountains" in 1986, seven years earlier (this means that 23 of Prince's songs in a row had made the top 40 before "The Morning Papers"). The song, despite missing the Billboard top 40, made the Top 40 mainstream chart, meaning it received significant radio airplay in America.

Critical reception
In an 2017 retrospective review, Andy Healy from Albumism stated that the pop-rock of the song "reinforce that no style or genre was beyond Prince's command". Upon the release, Larry Flick from Billboard described it as "a cinematic rock ballad, rife with retro-soul nuances". He added further, "An appealing, storytelling vocal is surrounded by rousing piano lines, nimble guitar riffs, and brassy horn fills. And, of course, Prince delivers a strong, affecting vocal. Will prove to be a refreshing respite from the usual cookie-cutter fare on pop radio." Randy Clark from Cashbox commented, "All hail the latest release from his Royal Badness' platinum album. This soulful, mid-tempo blues ballad has all the teasing, playful spirit we have grown to expect from the punk with the funk." 

Alan Jones from Music Week named it Pick of the Week, viewing it as "a straightforward pop ballad" and "a refreshing and simple song, enlivened by a powerful and flashy guitar solo". Parry Gettelman from Orlando Sentinel felt the slow track have a strong melody, complimenting it as "a pretty ballad spiced with R&B horns and pop-blues guitar." Charles Aaron from Spin wrote, "Another bewitching bit of gush from the past year's screwiest album. "If he poured his heart into a glass / And offered it like wine", etc., is pure pop poetry."

Charts

References

Prince (musician) songs
1990s ballads
1992 songs
1993 singles
Pop ballads
Rock ballads
Song recordings produced by Prince (musician)
Songs written by Prince (musician)
Paisley Park Records singles
Warner Records singles